Since Edward Said's death in 2003, several institutions have instituted annual lecture series in his memory, including Columbia University, University of Warwick, Princeton University, University of Adelaide, The American University in Cairo, London Review of Books, the Barenboim-Said Akademie and Palestine Center, with such notables speaking as Daniel Barenboim, Noam Chomsky, Robert Fisk, Marina Warner and Cornel West.

Columbia University
 2005 Daniel Barenboim: Wagner, Israel and Palestine 
 2006 Frank Kermode: Living On the Hyphen: Yeats, Anglo-Irish Poet
 2007 David Bromwich: Moral Imagination
 2008 Adonis: A Reading and a Recital
 2009 Noam Chomsky: The Unipolar Moment and the Culture of Imperialism
 2011 Ahdaf Soueif: Notes from the Egyptian Revolution 
 2012 W. J. T. Mitchell: Seeing Madness: Insanity, Media, and Visual Culture
2013 Raja Shehadeh: Is There a Language of Peace? Palestine Today and the Categorization of Domination
 2014 Richard Falk: The Palestinian Future After Gaza
 2015 Declan Kiberd: The Future of the Past: Revival Ireland 1891-1922
 2017 Catherine Hall: Imaginative Geographies of the Black/White Atlantic

University of Warwick
 2004 Tim Brennan: The Politics of Belief
 2005 Tariq Ali: Palestine & The Western Liberal Conscience
 2006 Ahdaf Soueif: The Heart of the Matter: Palestine in the World Today
 2007 Gilbert Achcar: Orientalism in Reverse: Post 1979 Trends in French Orientalism
 2008 Declan Kiberd: Edward Said and the Everyday
 2010 Eyal Weizman: Spatial Politics in Israel and Palestine
 2011 Mourid Barghouti
 2012 Benita Parry: What’s Left in Postcolonial Studies?
 2013 Samir Amin: The Implosion of the Contemporary System: A Challenge for the Societies of the South
 2014 Joe Cleary
 2015 Ilan Pappe
 2016 Karima Bennoune
 2017 Rafeef Ziadah

Princeton University
 2004 Mustafa Barghouti: Prospects for Peace: The Vital Role of Civil Society in Bringing Democracy, Justice, and Prosperity to Palestine and Israel
 2005 Judith Butler: Forgotten Histories of Post-Zionism: Universalism, Judaism, and the Messianic
 2006 Azmi Bishara: War, Occupation and Democracy: US Strategy in the Middle East
 2007 Tanya Reinhart: The Spirit of Struggle
 2008 Karen AbuZayd: Palestine Refugees: Exile, Isolation and Prospects
 2009 Amira Hass: One Occupation, Two Governments:The Onslaught On Gaza And The Palestinian Internal Rift
 2010 Noam Chomsky: "I Am Kinda": Reflections on the Culture of Imperialism
 2012 Mahmood Mamdani: “Settler Colonialism: Then and Now”
 2014 Richard Falk, Professor Emeritus of International Law at Princeton University, and United Nations Special Rapporteur, "On the situation of human rights in the Palestinian territories occupied since 1967” 
 2015 Tariq Ali, journalist, author and filmmaker
 2016 Jaqueline Rose, Professor of Humanities at the Birkbeck Institute for the Humanities in London 
 2017 Rashid Khalidi, Edward Said Professor of Modern Arab Studies and chair of the Department of History at Columbia University

University of Adelaide
 2005 Robert Fisk
 2006 Tanya Reinhart: In memory of Edward Said
 2007 Ghada Karmi: Israel’S Dilemma in Palestine: Origins and Solutions
 2008 Sara Roy: The Impossible Union of Arab and Jew: Reflections on Dissent, Remembrance and Redemption 
 2009 Saree Makdisi: From Occupation to Reconciliation
 2010 Tariq Ali
 2011 Noam Chomsky
 2012 Ilan Pappe
 2013 Mustafa Barghouthi
 2014 John Pilger
 2016 John Dugard

The American University in Cairo
 2005 David Damrosch: Secular Criticism Meets the World: The Challenge of World Literature Today
 2006 Barbara Harlow: Resistance literature revisited: From Basra to Guantànamo
 2007 Cornel West: The Vocation of a Democratic Individual
 2008 Terry Eagleton: Terror and Tragedy
 2009 : Contrapuntal Intellectual: Edward Said and Music
 2010 Judith Butler: "What Shall We Do Without Exile?" Edward Said and Mahmoud Darwish Addressing the Future
 2011 John Carlos Rowe : "American Orientalism After Edward Said"
 2012 Michael Wood: Literature, Cinema and the Taste of Knowledge
 2013 Saree Makdisi: Occidentalism: Making England Western
 2014 Marina Warner: Ways of Dwelling: Edward Said and the Travelling Text
 2015 Lila Abu-Lughod: A Settler-Colonialism  of Her Own: Imagining   Palestine’s Alternatives
 2016 Souleymane Bachir Diagne: Reflections on Philosophy in Africa
 2017 Ussama Makdisi: Anti-Sectarianism in the Modern Arab World
 2018 Robert Young: Said’s Late Style -- A Palestinian Aesthetic
 2019 Wadie Edward Said: Edward Said: Teachings, Familial and Otherwise
 2022 (March) Raja Shehadeh: The Peregrinations of Memory: The Case of Palestine
 2022 (November) Noam Chomsky: Global Realignments and the Prospects for a Livable World

The Jerusalem Fund
 2008 Avi Shlaim and Ali Abunimah: Palestinians and Israelis: Two states or one state?
 2009 Richard Falk: Imagining Israel-Palestine Peace: Why International Law Matters
 2010 Rashid Khalidi The Palestine Question and the U.S. Public Sphere 
 2012 Sara Roy: A Deliberate Cruelty: Rendering Gaza Unviable
 2013 Najla Said: Looking for Palestine
 2014 Judith Butler
 2015 Cornel West: The Legacy of Edward Said
 2016 Wadie Said: The Terrorism Label: an Examination of American Criminal Prosecutions
 2017 David Palumbo-Liu: Literature, Empathy, and Rights
2020 Daphne Muse "The Intersections of Our Resistance and the Legacies We Leave Future Generations"

London Review of Books
 2010 Marina Warner: Oriental Masquerade: Fiction and Fantasy in the Wake of the Arabian Nights
 2011 Rashid Khalidi: Human dignity in Jerusalem
 2012 Ahdaf Soueif: Mina's Banner: Edward Said and the Egyptian Revolution
 2013 Noam Chomsky: Violence & Dignity: Reflections on the Middle East
 2014 Raja Shehadeh: Is There a Language of Peace?
 2015 Daniel Barenboim: The Role of Music in Life
 2016 Naomi Klein: Let them Drown - The Violence of Othering in a Warming World
 2017 Mahmood Mamdani: Justice Not Revenge – Examining the Concept of Revolutionary Justice
 2018 Amira Hass: The Preventable: Israeli Fantasies and Techniques of Population Expulsion

Barenboim-Said Akademie
In 2018, Mena Mark Hanna, dean of the Barenboim-Said Akademie, launched the Edward W. Said Days, a three-day interdisciplinary festival reflecting upon the legacy of Said's thought. Each festival is thematic and features three keynote speakers, an artistic exhibition, films, and guest musical artists.

2018 "On Late Style": Teju Cole, Linda Hutcheon, Raja Shehadeh, and the Michelangelo String Quartet.
2019 "On Counterpoint": Michael Wood, Adania Shibli, Sa'ed Atshan, The Tallis Scholars, and Akinbode Akinbiyi.
2020 "Culture and Power" (postponed to 2021): Alex Ross, Elizabeth Wilson, Laleh Khalili, Elaine Mitchener, Gilbert Nouno, Michael Wendeberg, Jean Kalman, and Abdo Shanan.

References

Said
Columbia University